Inna Klinova (born 13 May 1986) is a Kazakhstani canoeist. She competed in the women's K-1 200 metres event at the 2016 Summer Olympics.

References

External links
 
 
 

1986 births
Living people
Kazakhstani female canoeists
Olympic canoeists of Kazakhstan
Canoeists at the 2016 Summer Olympics
Sportspeople from Cherkasy
Kazakhstani people of Ukrainian descent
Asian Games gold medalists for Kazakhstan
Asian Games medalists in canoeing
Canoeists at the 2014 Asian Games
Canoeists at the 2018 Asian Games
Medalists at the 2014 Asian Games
Medalists at the 2018 Asian Games
Asian Games silver medalists for Kazakhstan
21st-century Kazakhstani women